Leon Črnčič (born 2 March 1990) is a Slovenian football midfielder who plays for Jurovski Dol.

References

External links
NZS profile 

1990 births
Living people
Slovenian footballers
Association football midfielders
NK Aluminij players
Leicester City F.C. players
NK Rudar Velenje players
Slovenian Second League players
Slovenian PrvaLiga players
Slovenia youth international footballers
Slovenia under-21 international footballers
Slovenian expatriate footballers
Slovenian expatriate sportspeople in Italy
Expatriate footballers in Italy
Slovenian expatriate sportspeople in England
Expatriate footballers in England
Slovenian expatriate sportspeople in Austria
Expatriate footballers in Austria